Jeff Bentrim (born June 21, 1965) is a former American football player who played quarterback. He was elected to the College Football Hall of Fame in 1998 and the Bison Athletic Hall of Fame in 2001. He was recruited by the Saskatchewan Roughriders of the Canadian Football League. In Saskatchewan, he played third-string quarterback behind Kent Austin and Tom Burgess. The Roughriders promoted him to second-string quarterback after the 1989 season when Tom Burgess was traded to the Winnipeg Blue Bombers. He was part of three Division II football championship teams collegiately and the 1989 Grey Cup champion Saskatchewan Roughriders professionally.

References

1965 births
Living people
Players of American football from Saint Paul, Minnesota
North Dakota State Bison football players
College Football Hall of Fame inductees
Saskatchewan Roughriders players
American football quarterbacks
Canadian football quarterbacks
American players of Canadian football